The 9th National Television Awards ceremony was held at the Royal Albert Hall on 28 October 2003 and was hosted by Sir Trevor McDonald.

At the end of the ceremony, the ceremony's host, Sir Trevor McDonald, received the Special Recognition Award from the then Prime Minister Tony Blair.

Awards

References

National Television Awards
National Television Awards
National Television Awards
2003 in London
National Television Awards
National Television Awards